Illinois Route 154 is an east–west state road in southern Illinois. It runs from Illinois Route 3 in Red Bud to Illinois Route 37 in Whittington.

Route description 

Illinois 154 is the main east–west road through Pinckneyville. Just before intersecting Interstate 57 on the eastern end, it bridges Rend Lake. Illinois 154 has overlaps Illinois Route 13 and Illinois Route 148.

History 
SBI Route 154 originally ran from Pinckneyville to U.S. Route 51 north of Sunfield. In 1937 it was extended west to Red Bud, replacing Illinois Route 170 and Illinois Route 13 in the process. In 1984, Illinois 154 was extended east on a new road over Rend Lake, replacing IL 183. The original 1926 routing of Illinois 183 is most likely underwater.

Major Intersections

References 

154
1926 establishments in Illinois
Transportation in Perry County, Illinois
Transportation in Franklin County, Illinois
Transportation in Randolph County, Illinois